Events in the year 1814 in Norway.

Incumbents
Monarch: Frederick VI (until February 7), then Christian Frederick (May 17 – October 10), then Charles II (since November 4)

Overview 
1814 has historically been considered the most important year in the history of Norway. Sovereignty was transferred from the King of Denmark to the King of Sweden. The Constitution of Norway was signed at Eidsvoll on May 17, later to be designated and celebrated as Norwegian Constitution Day. For a detailed account of the events surrounding the re-formation of the country in modern times, see the article Kingdom of Norway (1814).

Events

14 January – Frederick VI of Denmark-Norway ceded the Kingdom of Norway to Charles XIII of Sweden in return for Swedish Pomerania. in exchange for Western Pomerania. Denmark also keeps the Norwegian overseas possessions: Faroe Islands, Iceland and Greenland, as part of the Treaty of Kiel.
11 February – Norway's independence was proclaimed, marking the ultimate end of the Kalmar Union.
16 February – The meeting of notables took place at Eidsvoll verk.
10 April – The Norwegian Constituent Assembly convened at Eidsvoll.
12 April – The Royal Norwegian Navy was re-established.
16 May – The Constitution of Norway was adopted by the Constituent Assembly.
17 May – The Constitution of Norway was signed and the Danish Crown Prince Christian Frederik was elected King of Norway by the Constituent Assembly.
20 May – The last day in session for the Constituent Assembly.
26 July – The Swedish campaign against Norway started.
14 August – The Convention of Moss was signed, ending the Swedish campaign against Norway with a Swedish victory.
4 November – The first session of the Norwegian Parliament elected Charles II as King in a personal union between Sweden and Norway.

Arts and literature

Births
1 April – Søren Jaabæk, politician and farmer (died 1894)
7 May – Henriette Hansen, ballerina  (died 1892)
27 May – Harald Nicolai Storm Wergeland, military officer, politician, Minister and mountaineer (died 1893)

Full date unknown
Peder Krabbe Gaarder, jurist and political theorist (died 1883)
Ketil Motzfeldt, politician and Minister (died 1889)
Nils Fredrik Severin Thambs, politician (died 1885)

Deaths
28 August – Erik Must Angell, jurist and politician (born 1744)
9 September – Niels Andreas Vibe, military officer (born 1759).
17 December – Christian Colbjørnsen, chief justice (born 1749)

See also

References